Donald Randolph (January 5, 1906 – March 16, 1993) was a film, television, and radio actor.  The actor, who appeared in Alfred Hitchcock's Topaz (1969), acted in dozens of radio dramas, television programs and over thirty films.

Randolph debuted on Broadway in Fatal Alibi (1932). His other Broadway credits include I Like It Here (1945), The Naked Genius (1943), The Sun Field (1942), Yours, A. Lincoln (1942), Lady in the Dark (1940), King Richard II (1939), Hamlet (1939), King Richard II (1936), Crime Marches on (1935) and Strange Gods (1932).

In 1950, he appeared in The Desert Hawk. In 1957, he appeared as General Mark Ford in the science fiction classic, The Deadly Mantis.

With his resonant voice, Randolph performed in numerous radio dramas broadcast during the 1940s and 1950s.

His television work included two episodes of Perry Mason; he played the role of the murderer Stephen Argyle in the 1958 episode, "The Case of the Cautious Coquette", and in 1959 he played the murder victim Curtis Runyan in "The Case of the Spanish Cross".  In 1968 Randolph appeared (credited as Don Randolph) as Don Ramon Monteja on The Big Valley in the episode titled "Miranda."

Death 
On March 16, 1993, Randolph died of pneumonia in Los Angeles. He was 87.

Papers
Some of Randolph's papers are housed at the UCLA Library Special Collections.

Filmography

13 Rue Madeleine (1946) - La Roche (uncredited)
For the Love of Mary (1948) - Asst. Attorney General
Bride of Vengeance (1949) - Tiziano
Rogues of Sherwood Forest (1950) - Archbishop Stephen Langton
The Desert Hawk (1950) - Caliph
Gambling House (1951) - Lloyd Crane
Flame of Stamboul (1951) - Hassan
Fourteen Hours (1951) - Dr. Benson
The Prince Who Was a Thief (1951) - Prince Mustapha
The Golden Horde (1951) - Torga
Ten Tall Men (1951) - Yussif
Harem Girl (1952) - Jamal
The Brigand (1952) - Don Felipe Castro
Assignment – Paris! (1952) - Anton Borvitch
Night Without Sleep (1952) - Dr. Clarke
Gunsmoke (1953) - Matt Telford
Dream Wife (1953) - Ali
The Caddy (1953) - Harvey Miller Sr.
All American (1953) - David Carter
The Mad Magician (1954) - Ross Ormond
The Gambler from Natchez (1954) - Pierre Bonet
Khyber Patrol (1954) - Prince Ishak Khan
The Adventures of Hajji Baba (1954) - Caliph
Phffft (1954) - Dr. Van Kessel
The Silver Chalice (1954) - Selech
Chief Crazy Horse (1955) - Aaron Cartwright
Son of Sinbad (1955) - Councillor
The Purple Mask (1955) - Andre Majolin
The Rawhide Years (1956) - Carrico
Over-Exposed (1956) - Coco Fields
The Deadly Mantis (1957) - Maj. Gen. Mark Ford
My Gun Is Quick (1957) - Colonel Holloway
Cowboy (1958) - Senor Vidal, Maria's Father
Topaz (1969) - Luis Uribe

References

External links

1906 births
1993 deaths
South African male film actors
South African male television actors
20th-century South African male actors
South African male stage actors
Deaths from pneumonia in California